Sultan Mahmud Airport  is an airport in Kuala Nerus, Terengganu, Malaysia. In 2017, it handled 943,660 passengers with 11,485 aircraft movements. It was named after the 16th Sultan of Terengganu, Almarhum Sultan Mahmud Al-Muktafi Billah Shah Ibni Almarhum Sultan Ismail Nasiruddin Shah, who ruled from 1979 to 1998.

In January 2008, the Malaysian government approved RM200 million to upgrade the airport. This includes funding to extend the runway and upgrade the terminal of the airport.

The terminal was designed to handle 2 million passengers every year. Malaysia Airlines has agreed with Tabung Haji that it will also bring passengers to Mecca via Jeddah and Medina in Saudi Arabia.

On October 11, 2008, a Malaysia Airlines Boeing 747-400 from Kuala Lumpur landed there, the first Boeing 747 to do so.

Airlines and destinations

Traffic and statistics

See also

List of airlines of Malaysia
List of airports in Malaysia
List of the busiest airports in Malaysia

References

External links

 Sultan Mahmud Airport, Kuala Terengganu at Malaysia Airports Holdings Berhad
 Sultan Mahmud Airport Real Time Flight Schedule
 
 

Airports in Terengganu
Kuala Nerus District